Stephanie Joan Weinstein (born 1967) is an American nutritionist and cancer epidemiologist who is a staff scientist in the metabolic epidemiology branch at the National Cancer Institute. She researches diet and cancer associations with a with a focus on vitamin D, vitamin E, and one-carbon metabolism. Weinstein was formerly an environmental toxicologist at a consulting firm.

Life 
Weinstein was born 1967 in Boston. She graduated from Andover High School. She received a B.S. in biology from Tufts University. After completing her undergraduate studies, Weinstein was an environmental toxicologist at the Jellinek, Schwartz & Connolly, Inc. consulting firm in Washington, D.C.

Weinstein earned a M.S. (1995) and Ph.D. (1998) in nutrition from Cornell University. Her master's thesis was titled, Hispanics in metropolitan New York: perceptions and practices related to seafood. Weinstein's dissertation focused on one-carbon metabolism and cervical cancer. It was titled, Serum and red blood cell folate levels in relation to invasive cervical cancer risk in a multicenter case-control study of United States women. Carole Bisogni was her doctoral advisor. Weinstein's research was influenced by mentor Regina G. Ziegler.

Weinstein was a postdoctoral fellow in the nutritional epidemiology branch (NEB), division of cancer epidemiology and genetics (DCEG), National Cancer Institute (NCI), for three years. After working for one year as a nutritionist in the Center for Nutrition Policy and Promotion, she returned to NCI as a staff scientist in NEB in 2002. She works in the metabolic epidemiology branch. Weinstein publishes on diet and cancer associations, with a focus on vitamin D, vitamin E, and one-carbon metabolism. She manages the Alpha-Tocopherol, Beta-Carotene Cancer Prevention (ATBC) Study, a prospective cohort study that began as a clinical trial. Weinstein works with the data coordinating center for the Connect for Cancer Prevention Study, a prospective cohort of 200,000 adults in the United States.

References 

Living people
1967 births
Scientists from Boston
Tufts University School of Arts and Sciences alumni
Cornell University alumni
National Institutes of Health people
Cancer epidemiologists
American women epidemiologists
American epidemiologists
American women nutritionists
21st-century American women scientists
American toxicologists